Mount Lucia is a volcanic cone mountain located at the Tawau Division of Sabah, Malaysia.

Geology 
The mountain is formed through the late Pleistocene volcanisms. Together with Mount Maria in the Tawau volcanic field, the mountains are made up of Pleistocene dacite.

History 
Since 1979, it has been a part of Tawau Hills Park. Jungle trekking activities are served by the park where the forest trail also leads to Mount Magdalena and Mount Maria.

See also 
 List of volcanoes in Malaysia

References 

Lucia
Protected areas of Sabah
Hiking trails in Malaysia
Volcanoes of Malaysia
Extinct volcanoes